Garry D. Malphrus is a board member with the Board of Immigration Appeals in the US.  He was elevated to the board on May 30, 2008. From June, 2005 until his appointment to the board, he was an immigration judge in Arlington, Virginia.

Malphrus appointment as an immigration judge by Alberto Gonzales was highly controversial. Many alleged that the appointment was a result of Malphrus' political ties to the Bush Administration. Prior to becoming an immigration judge, from 2001 to 2004, Judge Malphrus served as associate director of the White House Domestic Policy Council. He was also reported to have been a member of the so-called Brooks Brothers Riot, the Republican orchestrated protests during the 2000 Presidential Election Florida Recount.

As an immigration judge, Malphrus had a denial rate for political asylum claims almost exactly in the middle of all immigration judges nationwide.  According to the most recent national study, Malphrus denied 66.9 percent, which ranks his denial rate as 134 out of 267 immigration judges nationwide.

From 1997 until 2001, Malphrus served as Chief Counsel to the Senate Subcommittee on Criminal Justice Oversight under the Senator Strom Thurmond.

References

External links
Privately financed travel. LegiStorm

Year of birth missing (living people)
Living people
American judges